The Danaini are a tribe of brush-footed butterflies (family Nymphalidae). The tribe's type genus Danaus contains the well-known monarch butterfly (D. plexippus) and is also the type genus of the tribe's subfamily, the milkweed butterflies (Danainae).

The Danaini do not have a fixed colloquial name for the entire tribe, but in particular for subtribe Danaina the term tiger butterflies is occasionally used in reference to the numerous species in several genera.

Classification
Subtribe Danaina Boisduval, [1833]
 Amauris – clerics
 Danaus – monarchs, queens and tigers
 Ideopsis – glassy tigers, Southeast Asian tree- and wood-nymphs 
 Parantica – tigers
 Tiradelphe – Schneider's surprise
 Tirumala – blue tigers

Subtribe Euploeina Moore, [1880]
 Anetia – anetias and false "fritillaries"
 Euploea – crows
 Idea – tree nymphs, paper butterflies
 Lycorea – mimic queens
 Protoploea – magpie butterfly

The fossil milkweed butterfly Archaeolycorea from the Oligocene or Miocene Tremembé Formation of Brazil is often assigned to this tribe, specifically the Euploeina. Whether this is correct is not entirely certain.

References

External links
 "Danainae Boisduval, [1833]" at Markku Savela's Lepidoptera and Some Other Life Forms
 Danaini at Tree of Life

 
-
Butterfly tribes